John O'Keeffe sometimes O'Keefe ( – April 1838) was an Irish portrait and figure painter.

Life 

Born in Fermoy, County Cork of humble parentage, O'Keeffe began painting at an early age and was apprenticed to a coach painter. He began painting scenes for local theatres, working his way up to religious pictures for local Roman Catholic churches. In 1831 he sent a Portrait of a Lady and Crucifixion to the Royal Hibernian Academy.

He left Cork in 1834 for Dublin and continued to exhibit portrait and subject paintings. A painting from this period, A Sibyl, 1835, now stands in the Museum of Cork (1913). He exhibited a painting of the British army Field Marshal Edward Blakeney at the RHA in 1837. Just as his career was on the rise he died while on a visit to Limerick in April 1838. He left a widow and children.

The Crawford Gallery hold a portrait of Nano Nagle attributed to O'Keeffe.

References

1790s births
1838 deaths
19th-century Irish painters
Irish male painters
People from Fermoy
19th-century Irish male artists